The Knockout Stage of the 1992 Federation Cup Americas Zone was the final stage of the Zonal Competition involving teams from the Americas. Those that qualified for this stage placed first and second in their respective pools.

The eight teams were then randomly drawn into a two-stage knockout tournament, with the winners qualifying for the World Group.

Draw

Semifinals

Mexico vs. Ecuador

Colombia vs. Venezuela

Brazil vs. Uruguay

Cuba vs. Chile

Finals

Mexico vs. Venezuela

Brazil vs. Chile

See also
Fed Cup structure

References

External links
 Fed Cup website

1992 Federation Cup Americas Zone